Chenar Kol (also Romanized as Chenār Kol and Chenār Gol) is a village in Kakasharaf Rural District, in the Central District of Khorramabad County, Lorestan Province, Iran. At the 2006 census, its population was 69, in 12 families.

References 

Towns and villages in Khorramabad County